Chittoor Subramanyam (22 June 1898 – 18 Oct 1975) was an Indian carnatic musician.
 He received Sangeeta Kalanidhi award in 1954, and Sangeet Natak Akademi award in 1964.

Early life
Chittoor Subramanyam was born to Perayya and SMogilamma, on 22 June 1898 in a village near Punganur in Palamaner taluk, Chittoor district, Andhra Pradesh. His parents first taught him carnatic music and he later became a disciple of Naina Pillai of Kancheepuram. Under Nayana Pillai's tutelage, Subramanyam learned and honed his skills by doing Gurukula seva to his Guru (teacher/master) for more than two decades.

From the age of five, Subramnayam was performing Harikathas (musical renditions of mythology) and music performances. He completed his training with Pillai when he was aged 20 and began his major performances.

Professional career
Chittoor Subramanyam settled in Madras (now Chennai) but performed throughout India during a career lasting over 50 years.

He was well known for his repertoire of Thyagaraja Keerthanas (compositions) and mastery of Laya (rhythm). He had his own style called 'Kancheepuram School'. He was popular in Swaraprasthanam and Kalapramanam, noted for singing very rare keerthanas of Thyagaraja, Muthuswamy Dikshitar and other composers.

At a time when recording technology was in its infancy, his two discs for Columbia Records, which contained his own compositions such as Madhura Nagarilo Challanamma Bonu, Kulamulona Golladana and Mavallagadamma – demonstrated his originality as a composer and lyricist.

He realised the need to spread the art and taught disciples through the Gurukulam tradition. Many of Chittoor Subramanyam's disciples became well-known carnatic musicians. These include Madurai Somasundaram, Bombay S Ramachandran, Chittoor Ramachandran, T. T. Seetha, Tadepalli Lokanatha Sarma and Revathy Ratnaswamy. He started the Saint Thyagaraja Utsavam (annual music festival) in Tirupathi and awarded the title of Sapthagiri Sangeetha Vidwanmani to deserving exponents of carnatic music.

While in Tirupathi, he composed music for a number of kirthanas of Saint Annamacharya. Noted among them are – 'Ithadokade', 'Narayanathe'

Recognised as an ambassador for Carnatic music, he died in 1975. To commemorate his birth centenary, the annual Subramanya Sangeetha Kalakshetra was established and a three-day festival of music was held in Hyderabad.

Official posts
He was Head of the Music Department at Annamalai University and was connected with the music boards and committees of various other universities in South India as well as state and central government bodies. Among his official positions were
Principal, Sri Venkatesware College of Music and Dance, Tirupathi;
Professor of Music, The Central College of Music, Madras;
Principal, The Raja's College of Music, Thiruvayar;
Principal, The Ramanathan Music Academy, Jaffna, Ceylon (now Sri Lanka)(1967–1971)

Awards

Subramanyam received various awards. These included:

 Sangeetha Kalanidhi, in 1954, by Music Academy, Madras (now Chennai)
 Sangeet Natak Akademi Award, in 1964 by Sangeet Natak Akademi, India's National Academy of Music, Dance & Drama.
 Sangeetha Kalasikhamani Award, in 1964 by The Indian Fine Arts Society, Chennai
 Gana Kala Prapoorna, by A.P. Sangeetha Nataka Academy
 Swara Chakravarthi,
 Laya Brahma,
 Isai Perarignar, by Tamil Isai Sangam, Madras (now Chennai)
 Sapthagiri Sangeetha Vidwanmani, by Thyagarja Utsavam Committee, Tirupathi
 Isai Mannar

References

External links
 This Day That Age, dated 4 January 1955: Music Academy Sadas, The Hindu, 4 Jan 2005 – Sangita Kalanidhi award
 http://www.saigan.com/heritage/music/garlandn.htm
 http://www.carnatica.net/special/photoquiz.htm
 http://www.raaga.com/channels/carnatic/singers/Chittoor_Subramania_Pillai.html — recordings of 'mavallagadamma', 'kulamulona'
  - A kriti sung by Chittoor Subramaniam Pillai

1898 births
Male Carnatic singers
Carnatic singers
1975 deaths
Sangeetha Kalanidhi recipients
Recipients of the Sangeet Natak Akademi Award
Academic staff of Annamalai University
20th-century Indian male classical singers
Singers from Andhra Pradesh
People from Chittoor district